Pinoy Big Brother, more popularly known by its abbreviated title PBB, is the Philippine version of the Big Brother reality game show franchise. The word Pinoy in the title is a colloquial term for the Filipino people. Is a Philippine television reality show broadcast by ABS-CBN, Studio 23 (now S+A) and its international channel, TFC in various countries worldwide. Originally hosted by Willie Revillame, Toni Gonzaga and Mariel Rodriguez, it premiered on August 21, 2005. The uncut 24/7 version of the series can also be seen on the internet through Kumu, a Philippine online livestreaming app, as part of their partnership on the current season, as carried over from the previous season. Kumunity Season 10, the recently concluded season, was hosted by Bianca Gonzalez and Robi Domingo.

Other essential elements of the Big Brother franchise are present, such as weekly and daily challenges, the confession room, and the voice known only as "Big Brother," sometimes referred to as "Kuya" (Tagalog for an elder male sibling). Pinoy Big Brother uses their tagline "Teleserye ng Totoong Buhay" or the "Real Life Soap Opera".

Overview

Format
It follows the same premise as its many foreign counterparts around the world wherein a number of Filipinos volunteered to live inside a house for a certain number of days.

The elimination process in the show is the reverse of the original Dutch format. At the start of the elimination process, the "housemates" (as the contestants are referred to) vote for which two (sometimes more if there are ties or if Big Brother hands out an automatic nomination) fellow housemates they should eliminate. Once these nominations are chosen, the viewer votes come into play. For a week viewers are asked to vote, via SMS or voice messaging through PLDT's hotline (later abolished in favor of vote cards), for whoever they wanted to stay longer in the house. The housemate with the fewest viewer votes is eliminated. In the final week, the one with the most viewer votes will win the grand prize package, usually includes house and lot, a car, a business franchise, home appliances, and a holiday, and is given the title the Big Winner.

The show has aired also two special versions. One of which is the Celebrity version of the show, which housed commercial models, actors and actresses, radio and TV show hosts, musicians, sports and fashion personalities, and even politicians in a certain number of days (the duration of this particular version of the show is lesser compared to the regular seasons). Celebrity housemates, like many counterparts abroad, play for charity, aside from themselves. Prizes given away from edition to edition can vary, but basically, the cash prize an edition's winner can receive is the same as the prize for that winner's chosen charity organization, i.e. the winner and his/her charity each win the same amount.

The other one is the Teen version. The adolescents chosen for this particular version are aged 13 to 19 years old, are from different cities in the Philippines, sometimes even from certain overseas countries with sizable Filipino communities. Other factors are disregarded; in-school and out-of-school youths, natural-born Filipinos and adolescents with a mixture of Filipino and foreign blood, those with intact and broken families, and even teenage single parents may be eligible as long one passes the age requirement and has a background worth exploring during the edition's run. This edition is usually done in the Philippine "summer" months of late March to early June. During this time, temperatures in the country are at their highest and most students are out of school; a regular school year in the Philippines runs from June of one year to March of the next.

The House

The location of the Pinoy Big Brother House used to occupy an old house; it was demolished in order to give way for the show. The house was built within 79 days in 2005 and was built by 50 men round-the-clock. The house is actually a large, fully air-conditioned studio with a facade made to look like an ideal middle-class house. It is located just in front of the ELJ Communications Center in Eugenio Lopez Street, Diliman, Quezon City. The leftmost part of the facade was designed for another reality show franchise called Pinoy Dream Academy until 2011 when it was entirely removed in favor of Big Brother. The interior of the studio is designed to look like a real house with themes and interior design changing for every season of the show. The studio is also designed to capture every "housemate's" activities with state-of-the-art surveillance cameras and microphones. The house is surrounded by walls with two-way mirrors to allow cameramen to directly shoot from behind of the mirrors. The studio has backlots that are utilized for several purposes depending on the season's theme. Currently, the backlots are utilized as an activity area, swimming pool area, and multi-purpose hall. Previously, it was also used for a garden, a resort, a concert hall for Pinoy Dream Academy, an eviction hall, and even a slum. The multi-purpose hall, in particular, is used by the ABS-CBN Foundation as a relief goods storage facility during calamities. The house's set-up is that of a bungalow, even though the facade is obviously designed as a two-storey house. The second floor houses a state-of-the-art master control room and several amenities designed for the program's crew. Although any form of communication from the outside world is banned inside the house, there is a large flat-screen television set in the living room, used for only 2 purposes:
 To show any video Big Brother wanted to show to any or all housemates, especially that of the TV Mass every Sunday (contrary to reports early in the first season that a priest would visit them; later on, a priest unseen by viewers would visit them), and
 To announce the names of nominees for eviction directly to the housemates and the person evicted from the house. The housemates saw hosts talk to them during the nomination and eviction nights.

To complete the setup, 26 surveillance cameras are positioned all over the house to watch the housemates' every move, including the bathroom. For modesty's sake, images from the bathroom will be shown if the bathroom is used for any purpose other than bathing and using the toilet.

The set up of the house, especially when shown on television, makes the illusion that it is a one-storey house. But anyone who passes by the house can easily notice that its facade is that of a two-storey house. That is because the second storey houses parts of the control room. The actual front doors to the house area are actually further inside.

The house interior was rebuilt for the second season, the changes are the following:
 The number of cameras has been increased to 42.
 There was a secret room built behind the confession room and a large activity area leading from the garden.
 The house has a prayer room rather than just an altar.
 The flat screen monitor found in the living area is now used to call any housemate.
 The front door now leads to the Eviction Hall next door.
 Instead of watching a TV mass, the housemates have a spiritual session with Coney Reyes, the show's spiritual adviser. This has been done since the first Celebrity Edition.

For the Double Up, the house was divided into two different, yet equally furnished "houses." The changes are the following:
 The house was completely rebuilt from the ground up, new set up, and larger space.
 The guardians' area from the second teen edition was renovated to accommodate the season's twist.
 The housemates that are evicted every week exit the house through the confession room.
 Eviction takes place right outside of the Big Brother House.

For Unlimited, the facade of the house was fully renovated, and the gates were removed. The outside of the Big Brother house still served as the venue for evictions. The Big Brother house was still divided into two different themed houses yet both equally furnished. Both houses have separate confession rooms. The garden was removed, and the pool was retained and was considered a separate area and was called the Resort. The area was used for some time for Big Brother's rewards and tasks to the housemates, and was a venue for some House Battles. The activity area was retained and was renovated several times in order to accommodate the season's twists. Initially, it was used as a temporary shelter for the initial group of housemates and was themed after a typical urban slum house.

For 737, the former Pinoy Dream Academy facade became part of the Big Brother House as an extended facade. Also, the eviction now took place inside the ABS-CBN studios rather than outside the facade. The evicted housemate will be transferred by a car leading to the Eviction Studio.

For Otso, for the first time in the franchise's history, the entire one-way mirror system used for filming were removed and replaced by real walls. The number of cameras were increased to 50 and were upgraded to robotic cameras.

Primers
To prepare the viewers for the program's run, two primers were aired. The first was Eto na si Kuya! (Here Comes Big Brother), which talked about the essentials of the franchise and its success around the world. In the second primer, entitled Ang Bahay ni Kuya (Big Brother's House), Mariel and Toni indirectly gave the viewers a tour of the Big Brother house and its rooms, along with the control center and the confession booth. It also featured highlights a dry run where 12 of the network's talents stayed in the house for 24 hours and experienced the challenges and tests the housemates would experience at the start of the actual run.

Theme songs
Pinoy Ako
The show had its theme song called "Pinoy Ako" composed by Jonathan Manalo and Clem Castro, and performed by Orange and Lemons, which became the basis for much of the background music used in the show. Numerous versions of the theme song were used, including those of rock band Cebalo for Season 2, Toni Gonzaga for Unlimited, rock band Reo Brothers for All In, and a rendition from OPM veteran Rico Blanco now entitled "Pinoy Tayo" for Kumunity Season 10 in adults and Biga10 edition.

Sikat ang Pinoy
"Sikat ang Pinoy", composed by Jonathan Manalo, and performed by Toni Gonzaga and Season 1 ex-housemate Sam Milby, was mainly used for its celebrity editions. Another rendition of the song was sang by Pinoy Dream Academy winner Yeng Constantino and finalist Emman Abatayo, which was used during the run of the Celebrity Edition 2. A third rendition of the song by OPM band Agsunta with rap lyrics provided by Pinoy rapper Kritiko was introduced for Kumunity Season 10.

Kabataang Pinoy
"Kabataang Pinoy", composed by Jonathan Manalo and Jazz Nicolas, and performed by the Itchyworms, was mainly used for its teen editions since 2006. In Kumunity Season 10, two renditions were introduced for the said edition: the first version by Pinoy collective Nameless Kids which was introduced in November 2021, and another version by a collaboration of P-pop groups BINI and SB19 was introduced in March 2022 and eventually became the edition's theme song for the tenth season.

Other theme songs
A new theme song was introduced in Otso and was entitled "Otso Na", performed by Toni Gonzaga and Alex Gonzaga; worth noting is that the song includes a medley and the chorus of the old theme song "Pinoy Ako". Composed in the same manner as "Otso Na", a new theme song written and performed by Otso ex-housemates Jem Macatuno, Shawntel Cruz, Lie Resposposa and Kiara Takahashi called "Connected Na Tayo" was used for Connect.

Hosts

Originally, television personality and comedian Willie Revillame was the main eviction host of the show, along with young up-and-coming personalities Mariel Rodriguez and Toni Gonzaga. Gonzaga hosted the primetime telecast which chronicles the events of the day before (unless an episode is telecast live). Rodriguez, on the other hand, hosted the late night edition called Pinoy Big Brother: Uplate, which updates anything viewers missed in the primetime telecast, as well as what to look forward in the next one. Revillame hosted the live telecast of the eviction and the public revelation of the nomination for evictees, but only for the first season. He has not returned to the program even before the first Celebrity edition started because of the ULTRA stampede.

Luis Manzano took over Willie's place for the Celebrity Edition 1 and later returned in Teen Edition Plus in 2008.

On the Teen Edition 1 season, Bianca Gonzalez (a TV host and Celebrity Edition 1 ex-housemate) took over Mariel Rodriguez for Teen Edition: Update, and PBB: Uplate, a successful spin-off program that Mariel Rodriguez has hosted in its early editions — while Mariel became primetime host, whilst Gonzaga only hosted the Big Night prior to other commitments.

One of its original hosts, Rodriguez left the show in a surprising manner in 2010 prior to her transfer to TV5 and was replaced by former teen housemate and Teen Edition Plus runner-up Robi Domingo as co-presenter from Unlimited onwards.

Originally, Martin Concio, son of ABS-CBN president, CEO and COO Charo Santos-Concio was supposed to be in the roster but later backed out. Later, John Prats, also a former celebrity housemate and the runner-up in Celebrity Edition 1, joined Gonzaga, Gonzalez, and Domingo as hosts for Teen Edition 4.

On All In, Slater Young was introduced as one of the hosts, but was later moved to host that season's new online show, with Teen Edition 4s Joj and Jai Agpangan. He was then replaced by Toni's sister Alex Gonzaga, who only hosted the first night of the season (due to her surprise inclusion as a housemate and later houseguest). Once her time as houseguest came to an end, she continued to host PBB for its Uber show only.

On 737, Enchong Dee was introduced as a new host; however, as part of the tradition of the program, he had to stay in the House first and experience how the housemates are experiencing their stay inside the House. He later was allowed to exit the house; afterwards, he returned to his hosting stint as the show's hourly updater. On the other hand, Mariel Rodriguez returned to the show after five years to play as the last celebrity houseguest and later host the Big Nights marking her significant return as host, similar to that of what happened to Gonzaga in Teen Edition 1 Big Night.

On Lucky Season 7, Toni Gonzaga and Mariel Rodriguez both took a leave from hosting. This is in preparation for the delivery of their respective babies. It was Mariel who first announced the leave due to her delicate delivery after her two miscarriages. Toni gave birth to her first child Seve on September 30, 2016, adding that giving birth is her biggest fear now and returned upon the entering of the Dream Team.

On Otso, former Big Winners Melai Cantiveros (from Double Up) and Kim Chiu (from Teen Edition 1) joined Gonzaga and Domingo as new hosts, while Alex Gonzaga returned as a permanent co-host for the show. Rodriguez didn't return to host this season to focus on hosting It's Showtime and give more parenting time for her daughter. Gonzalez did not host during the tenure of the first teen batch as she was pregnant and later gave birth to her second child at that time, but later returned to host upon the entry of the first adult batch of housemates.

On Connect, 737 adult ex-housemate Richard Juan joined to host online updates; while Enchong Dee returned to hosts online contents for the show, together with Cantiveros (however, their appearances were only occasional). Gonzaga, Gonzalez and Domingo reprised their roles as hosts, with the latter two also hosting online companion shows for the program. Kim Chiu, Edward Barber, and Maymay Entrata were earlier reported to host online contents for the program (with Chiu and Entrata having joined the official launch and the Big Night respectively, while Barber only appeared on the Big Night, acting the comedy sketch as one of the housemates), but were never seen doing their hosting stints in the succeeding events of the show. Alex Gonzaga, on the other hand, did not return to the show due to her transfer to Brightlight Productions' noontime show Lunch Out Loud.

On Kumunity 10, Gonzaga, Gonzalez, and Domingo reprised their roles as hosts; Gonzalez, Domingo, Dee, and Cantiveros host online companion shows for the program on weekdays, while Otso Batch 4 ex-housemate Sky Quizon host the online weekend shows. Juan reprised his role in hosting online updates, with Dee, Cantiveros, and Barber substituting him occasionally in some updates at the start of the Adult Edition. Chiu and Barber joined the season's official launch, but was not seen doing their hosting stints in the succeeding events of the show, esp. Chiu as she also serve as co-host of It's Showtime. On February 9, 2022, during the Adult Edition, Gonzaga stepped down from her role as the show's main host, and endorsed Gonzales to assume the latter's duties. On February 12, 2022, during the adult edition's second eviction night, Gonzalez, Domingo, Chiu, Cantiveros, and Dee were introduced as the Pamilya ni Kuya as Gonzalez leads as the main host.

Other hosts
Asia Agcaoili spearheaded the show for the viewers of Studio 23. Her show, called Pinoy Big Brother on Studio 23: Si Kuya, KaBarkada Mo, not only featured snippets from the primetime telecast the night before, but also featured opinion polls both from the man on the street and those sending SMS, spoof segments, unaired videos, and feed from inside the house (either live feed or footage taped earlier). Studio 23 has stopped the practice since the second Celebrity Edition and instead resorted to airing the delayed late morning/early afternoon feeds.

Talk show host Boy Abunda hosted the post-season documentaries, was often invited to conduct interviews, and appeared on the Big Night to which he last appeared in Otso. It featured issues and controversies about the housemates.

Series overview
The show has spawned ten (including current) regular (or main) seasons, two celebrity seasons, four teen seasons since it began airing on August 21, 2005. In the entire 2,044 aggregate days of being filmed (including those days where the show did not air for any reason, such as the observance of the Holy Week), 392 housemates entered the house, 17 of whom were crowned Big Winners. The most recent winner is Anji Salvacion of Pinoy Big Brother: Kumunity Season 10.

Legend
  Regular Season

  Celebrity Season

  Teen Season

  Fused Season

Notes

Other shows

Companion shows
The reality television show has, in total, three companion shows to date. The first one was Pinoy Big Brother UpLate, a late-night program of the reality show, and has been one of the most successful companion shows in the entire history of the franchise and it was replaced by Games Uplate Live. It was primarily hosted by Mariel Rodriguez, while Bianca Gonzalez took over the program once the first Teen Edition started, as the former became primetime host. This aired is the final program of ABS-CBN from late at night to early morning, Monday to Friday, after the News & Public Affairs programs and before sign-off; and shows some updates, live feeds, and interviews. During the second regular season, the show was replaced by a late afternoon show called Pinoy Big Brother Über'''. The show would make its return in Pinoy Big Brother: Double Up under the name Pinoy Big Brother: Double UpLate with Bianca Gonzalez as host. After Pinoy Big Brother: Double Up, the show was not revived and was eventually replaced by Über.

The Pinoy Big Brother Über was also hosted by Mariel Rodriguez; and often Bianca Gonzalez, this is also the show's interactive portion wherein viewers can participate. The show was originally created as a replacement for UpLate as the show's main offshoot; the two programs would later become the show's co-main offshoots in third regular season. Über did not return for the Pinoy Big Brother: Unlimited season because of Mariel's departure from the show, and the new "UnliDay" edition of the show airing counterpart with its normal "UnliNight" edition. Über returned for the fourth teen season as Pinoy Big Brother: Teen Edition 4 Über 2012 onward with Bianca Gonzalez, Robi Domingo and John Prats. Also in the same Teen season, the show aired on Saturdays, known as SabadUber.

In every season of the local franchise, a short segment update show is aired every day from Mondays to Fridays. The show is called Pinoy Big Brother Update. The show provided daily happenings in the Big Brother house and introduces what will be shown in the primetime telecast. Mariel Rodriguez used to be the main Update host for the first season up to the first teen season. With the exception of second celebrity season to which Beatriz Saw was seen as the Update host, Bianca Gonzalez has been the Update host, replacing Mariel Rodriguez. Robi Domingo served as a guest host for one week during Pinoy Big Brother: Teen Clash 2010 as Bianca Gonzalez was then unavailable.

At this time, Pinoy Big Brother: 737 had an improved version as 737 Gold. On the 7th Season of the show, 737 Gold was replaced by "PBB Vietnam Mga Kwento ng Celebrity Housemates" during the celebrity housemates' stay in Vietnam, "PBB: Mga Kwento ng Teen Housemates" during the duration of the Teen Season, and Lastly it was replaced by "PBB Mga Kwento ng mga Housemates ni Kuya" during the Regular entry in the house.

On the 9th season, there are no companion shows for television, instead it is replaced by an online show called Kumunek Tayo hosted by Melai Cantiveros and Enchong Dee for the Afternoon Show, Bianca Gonzales and Robi Domingo for the Primetime Show via Kumu in the comfort of their own homes. For the 10th season, three online companion shows were added: First is Kumulitan which aired simultaneously with the program on weekdays, hosted by Melai Cantiveros and Enchong Dee, and sometimes by or with Bianca Gonzales and Robi Domingo; the second companion show is Kumunity: G sa Gabi which airs every weeknights at 11:00 p.m; and the last companion show is the Kumulitan Weekend which is hosted by Sky Quizon and Richard Juan, and airs simultaneously with the program during weekends.

 Pinoy Big Brother Season 1
 Mariel Rodriguez, "Ang Kapitbahay ni Kuya"
 Pinoy Big Brother: Celebrity Edition
 Mariel Rodriguez, "Ang Kapitbahay ni Kuya"
 Pinoy Big Brother: Teen Edition
 Mariel Rodriguez, "Ang Kapitbahay ni Kuya"
 Pinoy Big Brother Season 2
 Bianca Gonzales, "Ang Dating Boarder ni Kuya"
 Pinoy Big Brother: Celebrity Edition 2
 Beatriz Saw, "Ang Official Kuyarazzi"
 Pinoy Big Brother: Teen Edition Plus
 Bianca Gonzales, "Ang Dating Boarder ni Kuya"
 Pinoy Big Brother: Double Up
 Bianca Gonzales, "Ang Dating Boarder ni Kuya"
 Pinoy Big Brother: Teen Clash 2010
 Bianca Gonzales, "Ang Dating Boarder ni Kuya"
 Robi Domingo, "Ang Ka-Tropa ni Kuya"
 Pinoy Big Brother: Unlimited
 Toni Gonzaga, "Ang Ka-Chika ni Kuya"
 Bianca Gonzales, "Ang Dating Boarder ni Kuya"
 Robi Domingo, "Ang Tambay sa Bahay ni Kuya"
 Pinoy Big Brother: 737
Enchong Dee, "Ang Homeboy ni Kuya"
 Pinoy Big Brother: Connect
 Richard Juan, "Ang Online Oppa ni Kuya"
 Pinoy Big Brother: Kumunity Season 10
Sky Quizon, "Ang Online Hottie ni Kuya"
 Richard Juan, "Ang Online Oppa ni Kuya"

Game shows
Due to the show's popularity, a game show segment was launched by the network and was called Pinoy Big Brother: Yes or No. It was one which uses the board game format and uses questions related to the show as well as ABS-CBN's other primetime soap operas. The show was hosted by Mariel Rodriguez and it promised to give a daily studio contestant up to twenty-five thousand pesos. After a week as a segment of the show, it became a separate early afternoon game show on October 24, 2005. This show was terminated after the first season ended.

Another popular game show segment was launched during the first season of Pinoy Big Brother and was called What's the Word? That's the Word!. It was a raffle show hosted by Mariel Rodriguez and aired during commercial breaks at primetime telecast. At first, it started as a trivia game show for Pinoy Big Brother, and then later, it was extended as a trivia game show for the whole Primetime block. The show continued even after Pinoy Big Brother's first-year run ended. It later returned as the promotion What's the Word? Guess the Word! This time, however, the promotion is by Smart Communications and it is separate from Pinoy Big Brother.

Talk show
The popularity of the show and its former housemates spawned another show called Pinoy Big Brother Buzz, hosted by actress Anne Curtis, gossip reporter AJ Dee, and comedian Pokwang. Like its parent show The Buzz, the show tackles events and goings-on inside the house, the controversy surrounding the show, and the latest gossip about the housemates who were already evicted. The show was cancelled during the run of the Celebrity Edition.

Online shows
In the first special season, a late-night online show called Pinoy Big Brother Uplate Online was introduced. It was hosted by Slater Young, and Joj and Jai Agpangan. In the second special season, Pinoy Big Brother: 737 Online was introduced. It was hosted by Robi Domingo and Bianca Gonzalez and unlike the previous season, it occurred every 7:37 pm.

Spin-off shows
After the first regular season, a spin-off drama adventure series featuring the former housemates was aired for two weeks after Christmas and was called The Final Task. Another spin-off was the romantic reality show, called Melason in Love, was aired after the end of Pinoy Big Brother: Double Up. It was the first reality spin-off show of the franchise. The show focused to Melisa Cantiveros and Jason Francisco's love story which initially developed during the middle of the season. It features behind the scenes footage after the PBB Big Night, few of guesting programs in all ABS-CBN shows, and the struggles of the couple after the end of the season

Reunion specials
On June 4, 2006, a night after the finale of the Teen Edition, a live musical special called Pinoy Big Brother: the Big Reunion was held at the Aliw Theater in the CCP Grounds, Manila, with all the housemates for the first season, the Celebrity Edition, and the Teen Edition gathered in one spot. The show showcased and celebrated the success of the show, especially its greatest moments and accomplishments. This was done to cap off the show's first year on the air.

Two succeeding Big Reunions were held. The first was on June 9, 2008, wherein the housemates of the second Teen Edition, special housemates, and their Guardians took part. The second was on February 14, 2010, this time involving the Double Up housemates. Unlike the first Big Reunion, the gatherings only involved the housemates of each of the two seasons mentioned.

On June 27, 2010, another reunion special called High Five: The Big Five Years of Pinoy Big Brother gathered the Pinoy Big Brother: Teen Clash 2010 Big Six together with several notable housemates from editions past, many from the final group of their season, celebrate the memorable moments from the less than five years of the franchise.

Reception
ABS-CBN Studio Experience
In September 2018, ABS-CBN launched "ABS-CBN Studio Experience," an indoor theme park located in TriNoma, Quezon City. The said indoor theme park includes attractions that immerses its visitors to become a contestant, an actor, an audience or a production unit member of the network's different shows. One of the shows featured as an attraction in the theme park is Pinoy Big Brother where a visitor can experience to become a housemate and participate in various tasks to be given by Big Brother. The indoor theme park was closed in August 2020 due to ABSCBN focusing more on their digital and cable businesses after its franchise was denied.  

Controversies and criticisms

Like other franchises around the world, the concept and implementation of Pinoy Big Brother has been a subject of controversy and criticism from the Filipino public and the news media. Investigations of some incidents were held by numerous organizations, including Endemol, the franchiser of Big Brother'', and TV watchdog MTRCB since its launch in 2005.

Awards and recognitions

References

External links
 Pinoy Big Brother Official website
 Pinoy Big Brother at the Internet Movie Database
 

 
ABS-CBN original programming
2005 Philippine television series debuts
2022 Philippine television series endings
Filipino-language television shows
Television shows filmed in the Philippines